Anderson Bridge can refer to:

Anderson Bridge (Singapore), Singapore River, Singapore

Anderson Memorial Bridge, Charles River, Massachusetts, United States

Charles Anderson Memorial Bridge, Pennsylvania, United States

Anderson Street Bridge (Hackensack River), New Jersey, United States

Forrest H. Anderson Memorial Bridge, Missouri River in Craig, Montana, United States

Anderston bridge, a footbridge in Glasgow, Scotland.

Anderson Bridge massacre, 1950 in Pakistan

Anderson Bridge (New Brunswick), Canada